Nannette Streicher (née Anna-Maria Stein; 2 January 1769, Augsburg – 16 January 1833, Vienna) was a German piano maker, composer, music educator, writer and a close friend of Ludwig van Beethoven.

Life
Nannette Streicher was the sixth child of the organ and piano maker Johann Andreas Stein in Augsburg (1728–1792) and his wife Maria Regina Stein née Burkhart. Early on, she received piano lessons from her father, who was influenced by his friend Ignaz von Beecke. In Augsburg Nannette Stein played piano at concerts, sometimes with her friend Nanette von Schaden. In 1787 she sang "some minor arias" in a concert. She had to give up singing later for health reasons. After her father's death on 29 February 1792, she continued the piano workshop independently.

Building pianos
In 1793 she married the musician Johann Andreas Streicher (1761–1833) and moved with him to Vienna in 1794. She took over her father's business, which was called J.A. Stein.  Initially she partnered with her 16-year-old younger brother Matthias Andreas Stein (1776-1842) under the business name Geschwister Stein.  After 1802, she and her brother parted company, and she continued building pianos under her name (Nannette Streicher née Stein). With the support of her husband and from 1824 to 1825 with their son, Johann Baptist (1796–1871) as a partner, the business became an important piano manufacturer.  They produced 50 to 65 grand pianos each year. Johann Baptist Streicher was the sole owner of the factory, which under his leadership acquired many patents and became world famous. The company was sold in 1896 to the brothers Stingl.
Two fine instruments by Streicher are in the collection of Scenkonstmuseet (earlier known as Musikmuseet) in Stockholm, Sweden. They are numbered M266 & F332.

Concerts
Nannette and Andreas Streicher were not just piano makers. The concerts she organised were an important contribution to Viennese musical life, first in her apartment, then from 1812 in a piano salon she organized next-door to the Streicher showrooms. This seated 300, and offered young artists welcome opportunities for performance. The friends and customers of the couple included Ludwig van Beethoven and Johann Wolfgang von Goethe.

Social circle
Nannette sometimes played in private before the friends and visitors of the music circle, sometimes together with her daughter Sophie (1797–1840), an equally gifted piano player. Her circle included many great musicians of Vienna, and her friendship with Beethoven was such that for eighteen months beginning in 1817 she assumed considerable responsibility for his domestic arrangements. This is documented in more than sixty letters, in which the composer sought advice and assistance in household and educational questions, after he was granted custody of his nephew Karl.

Death
Nanette Streicher died on 16 January 1833 after two months of illness.

Selected works
 Klage über den frühen Tod der Jungfer Ursula Sabina Stage. Für eine Singstimme und Klavier (c-Moll), Augsburg 1788.
 Marche à huit Instruments à vent. N. Simrock, Bonn & Cologne, 1817.
 Deux Marches pour le Piano Forte. Composées par Madame Nannette Streicher née Stein. Prix 75 Cs. Bonn et Cologne chez N. Simrock. Propriété de l‘Editeur 1378. [1827.]

Recordings made with instruments by Nannette Streicher
 Jan Vermeulen. Franz Schubert. Works for fortepiano. Volume 1. Played on 1826 Nannette Streicher piano.

References

Bibliography
Uta Goebl-Streicher, Jutta Streicher und Michael Ladenburger (eds.). Beethoven and the Viennese piano.
Catalog of the collection of old musical instruments, Part I. Vienna: Kunsthistorisches Museum, 1966.
Women's Conversation Lexikon, Volume 9, 1837, pp. 449–452.

External links

1769 births
1833 deaths
Piano makers
German musical instrument makers
German music educators
18th-century German musicians
Musicians from Augsburg
18th-century German businesspeople
19th-century German businesspeople
19th-century German educators
18th-century Austrian businesspeople
19th-century Austrian businesspeople